Roger Lane is an American historian, and Professor Emeritus at Haverford College.

He was born on January 17 1934 to Eileen O’Connor and Alfred Baker Lewis, who gave him an invented surname before marrying in 1940.  Raised in New England, he graduated from Yale (summa cum laude, Phi Beta Kappa) in 1955. At Columbia during 1955-6 he took a graduate history seminar with Richard Hofstader, then spent a year teaching and coaching athletics at Brunswick School in Connecticut.  From there he earned a PhD at Harvard, as a student of the pioneering social historian Oscar Handlin, before accepting a position at Haverford in 1963.

His study of Policing the City: Boston, 1822-1885 ( Harvard University Press, 1967), was the first on the origins of urban police in America.  A 1968 article in the Journal of Social History, "Urbanization and Criminal Violence in the 19th  Century", challenged the then-conventional wisdom that crime naturally increases as cities grow.  This earned an appointment to The President’s Commission on the Causes and Prevention of Violence, which reprinted it.  its depiction of the regimentation of life under the Industrial Revolution won the attention of Theodore Kaczynski,  the infamous “Unabomber,” who quoted it extensively in his 1995 manifesto, giving Lane a small role in his identification and capture.

Violent Death in the City: Suicide, Accident and Murder in 19th Century Philadelphia, (Harvard University Press, 1979), showed how the behavioral demands of school, office, and factory decreased the external manifestations of aggression, as murder, while increasing the internal, as suicide.  Roots of Violence in Black Philadelphia, 1860-1900, (Harvard University Press, 1986) focused  on how exclusion from factory and white collar jobs pushed many African Americans into dangerous criminal entrepreneurship; it won the prestigious  Bancroft Prize, from the Trustees of Columbia University, as one of that year’s best books in American  History.  William Dorsey’s Philadelphia and Ours: On the Past and Future of the Black City in America, (Oxford University Press, 1991) showed how this effect blighted a promising post-Civil War Golden Age in what was then  the biggest and best-educated African American community in the North. Murder in America: A History (Ohio State University Press, 1997), traced its subject from medieval England into the late 20th Century.

Lane has won the Lindback Award and several other teaching awards;  in 1987 the Philadelphia Inquirer named him one of the “Ten Top Profs” in the metropolitan area.  A small college, Haverford allowed him to participate in intramural athletics and theater, and enabled him to explore courses beyond American History in the humanities, touching e.g. on The Bible, Shakespeare, and Freud. The college granted him an honorary degree after his retirement in 1999. 

He has appeared in many television documentaries, on ethnic history, crime, policing, guns, and murder.

Lane’s two younger brothers, John Michael Lane and Stephen Lewis, have died. Marriage to Patricia Ann Hindle in 1955 produced  two children, Margaret Mary and James Michael Lane, before their divorce in 1971. He married  Marjorie Gail Merklin in  1974, and they together have a daughter, Joanna Lewis Lane.

Living in Haverford, PA, he and Marjorie have been active in civic life, especially involving the local African American community. Other interests include reading, politics, sports, and music, lecturing on social history, and tutoring both children and adults.

Awards
 1987 Bancroft Prize
 1992 Urban History Association's award.

Works
 Policing the City: Boston 1822-1885, Harvard University Press, (1967).

References

External links
"Murder, Mayhem and Mystery: It's All Elemental, 'Dear Reader' in Roger Lane's New Book ", Haverford News
"What Do Historians Have to Say About Violence?", HFG Review, Jeffrey S. Adler and Thomas W. Gallant

21st-century American historians
21st-century American male writers
Haverford College faculty
Living people
Harvard University alumni
Yale University alumni
Year of birth missing (living people)
Bancroft Prize winners
American male non-fiction writers